U.S. Coast Guardmaster chief petty officercollar device

U.S. Coast Guardmaster chief petty officersleeve rating insignia

United States Navymaster chief petty officer collar insignia

United States Navymaster chief petty officershoulderboard

United States Navyrating badge for amaster chief boatswain's matewith 12 years or more of service

Master chief petty officer (MCPO) is an enlisted rank in some navies. It is the ninth (just below the rank of MCPON) enlisted rank (with pay grade E-9) in the United States Navy and United States Coast Guard, just above  Senior Chief Petty Officer (SCPO). Master chief petty officers are addressed as "Master Chief (last name)" in colloquial contexts. They constitute the top 1.25% of the enlisted members of the maritime forces.

Prior to 1958, chief petty officer was the highest enlisted rate in both the U.S. Navy and U.S. Coast Guard. This changed on 20 May 1958 with the passage of Public Law 85-422, the Military Pay Act of 1958, which established two new enlisted pay grades of E-8 and E-9 in all five branches of the U.S. Armed Forces. In the Navy and Coast Guard, the new E-8 pay grade was titled Senior Chief Petty Officer and the new E-9 pay grade as Master Chief Petty Officer, with the first selectees promoting to their respective grades in 1959 and 1960.

Advancement
In the Navy, advancement to master chief petty officer is similar to that of chief petty officer and senior chief petty officer. It carries requirements of time in service, superior evaluation scores, and selection by a board of master chiefs. Similarly, senior chief petty officers and chief petty officers are chosen by selection boards. In the Coast Guard, advancement to master chief petty officer is similar to other advancements consisting of competition with other advancement-eligible senior chief petty officers. Eligible candidates are prioritized based on written examination scores, evaluations, award points, time in service, and time in grade.  Master chief petty officers are then selected monthly from this prioritization list as positions become available.

Petty officers of all grades possess both a rate (the enlisted term for rank) and rating (job, similar to a military occupational specialty (MOS) in other branches). The full title (most commonly used) is a combination of the two. Thus, a master chief petty officer with the rating of fire controlman would properly be called a master chief fire controlman.

Each rating has an official abbreviation, such as FC for fire controlman, FT for fire control technician, and STS for sonar technician, submarines. When combined with the rate abbreviation (MC for master chief without rating), it produces the full rate designation, such as FCCM for fire controlman chief master (more commonly said as Master Chief Fire Controlman). It is not uncommon practice to refer to the master chief by this shorthand in all but the most formal correspondence (such as printing and inscription on awards). Mostly, though, they are simply called "master chief", regardless of rating.

The rate insignia for a master chief is a white eagle with spread wings above three chevrons. The chevrons are topped by a rocker (arc) that goes behind the eagle. Two inverted silver stars (a reference to the stars used on the sleeves of line officers) are placed above the eagle. Between the arc and the top chevron is the specialty mark of the enlisted rating.  This is used on the service dress blue, dinner dress blue jacket, and dinner dress white jacket uniforms. On other uniforms, the insignia used for shirt collars and caps is the one that has become universally accepted as the symbol of the chief petty officer. This is a gold foul anchor (though sometimes the word "fouled" is used, the proper term is "foul anchor") superimposed with a silver "USN" (Navy) or a silver shield (Coast Guard). As on the rating badge, this is capped by two five-pointed stars, showing one ray down.

Command master chief petty officer

Master chief petty officers are generally considered to be the technical experts in their fields. They serve at sea and ashore in commands of all sizes. Some master chiefs choose to enter the command master chief petty officer program. If selected, a master chief receives additional leadership training and is assigned to a command as the command master chief (CMC). The command master chief is the senior enlisted person at a command and works as a liaison between the commanding officer and the enlisted ranks, serving as the senior enlisted leader. In this capacity, the CMC assists the commanding officer in issues of quality of life, discipline, training, and morale. On submarines, the equivalent of a CMC is called the chief of the boat or "COB". The CMC insignia has a silver star in lieu of the enlisted rating insignia between the rocker and the top chevron.

Fleet and force master chief petty officer

Fleet and force master chiefs are appointed by the commander of a fleet or a force command to serve as their senior enlisted adviser. These two ranks are equivalent and their insignia is also the same—a master chief rating badge with two gold stars above the eagle and a gold star for the rating insignia.

A force master chief petty officer (FORCM) is a master chief who has virtually the same responsibility as command master chiefs, but for larger force commands rather than a single unit. There are 15 force master chief positions in the Navy:
Bureau of Medicine and Surgery
Naval Air Force, U.S. Atlantic Fleet
Naval Air Forces
Naval Education and Training Command
Naval Facilities Engineering Command
Naval Special Warfare
Naval Surface Force, U.S. Atlantic Fleet
Naval Surface Forces
Naval Information Forces
Navy Expeditionary Combat Command
Navy Installations Command
Navy Personnel Command
Navy Reserve Forces
Submarine Force, U.S. Pacific Fleet
Submarine Force U.S. Atlantic Fleet

A fleet master chief petty officer (FLTCM) is a master chief who again has virtually the same responsibility as command master chiefs, but for larger fleet commands. There are four fleet master chief positions in the Navy:
United States Fleet Forces Command
United States Pacific Fleet
United States Naval Forces, Europe/Africa
Fleet Master Chief, Manpower, Personnel, Training, and Education (N1/NT)

Master Chief Petty Officer of the Navy

There exists one post that is unique – Master Chief Petty Officer of the Navy (MCPON, pronounced ). The holder of this post is appointed by the Chief of Naval Operations (CNO) to serve as the most senior enlisted member in the Navy. The MCPON adds a third star above the rating insignia described earlier, and all three stars are gold (silver on the gold foul anchor collar device). Likewise, the rating specialty mark is replaced by a gold star. As of September 2022, James Honea is the current MCPON.

Master Chief Petty Officer of the Coast Guard

The Master Chief Petty Officer of the Coast Guard (MCPOCG) is appointed by the Commandant of the Coast Guard to serve as the most senior enlisted member in the Coast Guard. The MCPOCG adds a third star above the rating insignia described earlier, and all three stars are gold (silver on the gold foul anchor collar device). Likewise, the rating specialty mark is replaced by a gold shield. The current master chief petty officer of the Coast Guard is Heath B. Jones.

In popular culture
 In the Halo video game franchise, the protagonist, Master Chief Petty Officer John-117, commonly referred to as "Master Chief" or simply "Chief", derives his nicknames from his rank of master chief petty officer.
 In the 2012 TV series Last Resort, the character Joseph Prosser, (portrayed by Robert Patrick)  is the Chief of the Boat (COB) of USS Colorado and holds the rank of master chief petty officer. 
 In the 2000 film Men of Honor, the character Leslie William "Billy" Sunday (portrayed by Robert De Niro) is a U.S. Navy diver with the rank of master chief petty officer. This film is based on real-life events of Carl Brashear, the first black man to be accepted into the salvage divers school; he eventually also earned the rank of master chief himself.
 In the 2017 TV series SEAL Team, the character Jason "Jace" Hayes (portrayed by David Boreanaz) is a United States Naval Special Warfare Development Group leader of a Navy SEAL team (Bravo Team) with the rank of master chief petty officer.
 In the film GI Jane, Viggo Mortensen plays a master chief in charge of training elite Navy SEALs.

See also
 Goat locker
 Petty officer
 U.S. Navy enlisted rate insignia
 Comparative military ranks

References

External links
 U.S. Navy uniform regulations
 U.S. Military enlisted ranks
 Official website of the Master Chief Petty Officer of the U.S. Navy
 Official website of the Master Chief Petty Officer of the U.S. Coast Guard

United States military enlisted ranks
Military ranks of the United States Coast Guard
Military ranks of the United States Navy
Marine occupations